Captain Manoj Kumar Pandey, PVC (25 June 1975 – 3 July 1999) was an officer of the Indian Army who was posthumously awarded India's highest military honour, the Param Vir Chakra, for his audacious  courage and leadership during the Kargil War in 1999. An officer of the 1st battalion, 11 Gorkha Rifles (1/11 GR), he sacrificed his life for the nation in battle on Jubar Top of the Khalubar Hills in Batalik Sector of Kargil.

Early life
Manoj was born on 25 June 1975 in Rudha village, in the Sitapur district of Uttar Pradesh. He was born to Gopi Chand Pandey, a small-town businessman living in Lucknow, and Mohini. He was eldest in his family. He was educated at Uttar Pradesh Sainik School, Lucknow and Rani Laxmi Bai Memorial Senior Secondary School. He had a keen interest in sports with boxing and body building in particular. He was adjudged the best cadet of junior division NCC of Uttar Pradesh directorate in 1990.

Prior to his selection, during his Services Selection Board (SSB) interview, the interviewer asked him, "Why do you want to join the Army?" He immediately replied, "I want to win the Param Vir Chakra." Captain Manoj Kumar Pandey did win the country's highest gallantry honour but posthumously.

Military career

He graduated from the National Defence Academy in 90th course and belonged to Mike Squadron (Mustangs). Pandey was commissioned as a lieutenant in the 1st battalion, 11 Gorkha Rifles on 7 June 1997.

Kargil War
In early May, the intrusion in the Kargil sector was reported. The 1/11 Gorkha Rifles battalion had finished a one-and-a-half year tenure in the Siachen Glacier and was on-the-move to its peace-time location in Pune. The battalion was asked to move to the Batalik sector in Kargil. It was among the first units to be inducted into this sector. The unit, commanded by Colonel Lalit Rai, was assigned responsibility of the Jubar, Kukarthaam and Khalubar areas and their battalion headquarters was in Yeldor.

Pandey, as part of the battalion, was involved in a series of boldly led attacks. He also took part in a series of actions which led to the capture of Jubar Top.

Param Vir Chakra action

In early July, 'B' Company of 1/11 GR was assigned the task to capture Khalubar top. Pandey was commanding a Platoon in this company. Quickly sizing up the situation,  he killed two enemy personnel and destroyed the second position by killing two more.

Although wounded in the shoulder and leg, he pressed on his solitary charge with serious determination, until he closed in on the first bunker. The two armies engaged in a ferocious, hand-to-hand combat. The troops charged at the enemy and fell upon them.  Undaunted and without caring for his grievous injuries, he continued to lead the assault on the fourth position urging his men and destroyed the same with a grenade, even as he got a fatal burst on his forehead. He collapsed at the final bunker and succumbed to his injuries.

Citation
The Param Vir Chakra citation reads as follows:

Gallantry award ceremony
On the occasion of Independence Day 1999, a month after the war ended, the President of India approved the award of the Param Vir Chakra to Pandey and three others - Captain Vikram Batra, Rifleman Sanjay Kumar and Grenadier Yogendra Singh Yadav. His father, Gopichand Pandey, received the award from the President of India K. R. Narayanan during the Republic Day Parade in New Delhi on 26 January 2000.

Honours and legacy

Pandey is one of the 21 individuals who have been decorated with India's highest military honour. As a PVC awardee, his statue is at the Param Yodha Sthal at the National War Memorial.
After his death, multiple places have been named after him including his almae matres.

Rani Laxmi Bai Memorial Senior Secondary School

 They constructed an auditorium in his name, which was inaugurated by his parents.

UP Sainik School

Pandey's alma mater, the Uttar Pradesh Sainik School, Lucknow was renamed after its most illustrious alumnus. It is now called CAPTAIN MANOJ KUMAR PANDEY U.P. SAINIK SCHOOL, LUCKNOW.
 An auditorium in the school was named after him. Its foundation stone was laid by General VK Singh in 2011. 
 The school conducts an inter-school football tournament annually - 'Late Capt. Manoj Kr. Pandey PVC Football Tournament  Trophy'.
 The main gate was named after him.

National Defence Academy
 The National Defence Academy named the science block as the "Manoj Pandey Block".
 His portrait hangs at the Mike squadron of the academy.

Services Selection Board, Allahabad
A hall is made in the name of Capt. Manoj at Services Selection Board Allahabad named as Manoj Pandey Block.

Roads and buildings
 The Army Welfare Housing Organisation (AWHO) designed and constructed an apartment complex for veterans in Ghaziabad district, Uttar Pradesh, and named it for Pandey as "Manoj Vihar".
 The army quarters near the Cardio Thoracic Center (CTC) hospital in Pune is named after Martyr Capt Manoj Pandey as "Capt. Manoj Pandey Enclave"
 A roundabout is also named after Martyr Capt.Manoj Pandey as "Captain Manoj Pandey Chowk" in his home district Sitapur, Uttar Pradesh and center of Gomti Nagar, Lucknow, Uttar Pradesh, India.
 A gallery in the Kargil War Museum at Dras is named after him.
 Gen MM Naravane dedicated a memorial to Capt Manoj Pandey, at his native village Rura on 19 March 2021
Officers Training Academy 
Cadets mess is named as Capt Manoj Pandey mess

In popular culture
He was portrayed by Ajay Devgn in the film LOC: Kargil.

Notes

References

External links
Indian Army Webpage
 Manoj Pandey Chowk is at coordinates 

Indian military personnel killed in action
Recipients of the Param Vir Chakra
1999 deaths
Military personnel from Lucknow
Kargil War
1975 births
Sainik School alumni
People from Sitapur
People of the Kargil War
National Defence Academy (India) alumni